The Order of Freedom of Barbados is a national honour established by the Order of Freedom of Barbados Act 2019 by the Parliament of Barbados. As part within the overarching Order of Barbados, it ranks higher than the Order of the Republic, but is below the separate and supreme Order of National Heroes.

Officers and classes 

The Order consists of one Class, which is not named in the Act. There is no limit as to how many appointments can be made to each grade each year, except in regard to honorary members, whose limit is set to two a year; appointments are made each year on Independence Day (30 November) by the president on the advice of the Prime Minister.

Recipients are entitled to use the post-nominal letters "FB", which means "Freedom of Barbados", and to the style The Most Honourable. The insignia of the Order is set by the Prime Minister.

List of officers 

The current officers of the Order of Barbados, in accordance with the Act, are as follows:

 Chancellor: Sandra Mason,as Governor General (2018 - 2021) and subsequently as President of Barbados (2021-)
 Secretary: Vacant (2021-)

Recipients 

 

 Professor Violet Eudine Barriteau  — For her outstanding contribution to tertiary education and pioneering leadership in the development of gender studies and the promotion of gender equality.

 Dr. Anthony Nicholas Carter  — For his seminal work in music, in particular, his contribution to the art form of calypso, as well as, folk music through an exceptional repertoire of lyrics and melody, and his work with youth in music.

 Patrick Douglas Frost  — For his dedicated service as an educator and sterling contribution to the trade union movement.

Honorary recipients 
 Charles III — Former heir to the Barbadian throne, in recognition of his support for the efforts of developing countries in the area of climate change and sustainable development and fostering the spirit of entrepreneurship among young people globally.

 Uhuru Kenyatta, former President of Kenya.

References 

Orders, decorations, and medals of Barbados
Recipients of the Order of Freedom of Barbados
Awards established in 2019